Roda is a village near Mangualde in the district of Viseu, Portugal.

References

Villages in Portugal